Ville de Charleroi was a Belgian professional road cycling team that existed from 1995 until 2004 under several different names.

The team was selected to compete in the 2004 Giro d'Italia.

The team folded in 2004 after competing in the first division for its final season. Chocolade Jacques, one of the primary sponsors at the time, sponsored  the following year.

UCI ranking history

References

Cycling teams based in Belgium
Cycling teams established in 1995
Cycling teams disestablished in 2004
1995 establishments in Belgium
2004 disestablishments in Belgium